Beatriz Argimón Cedeira (born 14 August 1961) is a Uruguayan politician and notary from the National Party (PN) serving as the 18th Vice President of Uruguay since March 1, 2020, being the first woman elected to that position.    

Graduated from the University of the Republic in 1989 with a degree in notarization, she also studied human rights, family law, and juvenile law. She served as a National Representative for Montevideo Department between 2000 and 2010, and has been a member of the National Party Board since 2009. Since November 2020, she has been a member of the Executive Committee of the Inter-Parliamentary Union. She is an activist for women's rights, and was one of the founders of the "Network of Political Women" and of the "Bicameral Female Caucus" of the General Assembly.

Biography 
Beatriz Argimón Cedeira was born in Montevideo, on August 14, 1961 to Juan Carlos Argimón, a civil servant, and María Esther Cedeira, a housewife. The oldest child in a Catholic family, she has a sister, Estela. She attended Primary School No. 8 "República de Haití" in Montevideo, and later the high school at the José Pedro Varela National School.

When Argimón was in high school, her father, who worked as manager of the fishing terminal of Industrias Loberas y Pesqueras del Estado, was dismissed by the civic-military dictatorship, but was reinstated in the position once the regime ended. In 1989 she graduated from the University of the Republic with the title of Notary Public, and practiced for ten years. She also studied human rights and the family. While she was studying, she began to work as an administrator in the National Administration of State Sanitary Works, a position to which she agreed after winning a public tender.

From 2008 to 2011 she served as a panelist on the Teledoce weekday program Esta boca es mía. In addition, from 2015 to 2017 was the president of the Josefa Oribe Study and Training Center. She currently hosts a cable program called Diseñarte, which aimed to promote nationally manufactured products.

Political career

Beatriz Argimón began her political activism at the age of 17 during the dictatorship. Four months after graduating from college, she was a candidate for Edila de Montevideo (member of the legislature of the capital) in the 1989 election.
During Luis Alberto Lacalle administration, she served as head of the National Institute of Minors. Together with the then first lady Julia Pou, Argimón founded the group "Acción Comunitaria", and was elected National Representative for Montevideo for the 45th Legislature (2000-2005) in the 1999 election. Later she joined the Wilsonist Current, being reelected to the position for the 46th Legislature (2005-2010). She became the first woman reelected consecutively in the history of the National Party. 

In the course of 2007, Argimón declared herself independent within the PN. In the 2009 presidential primaries she presented her own ballot (List 2018) and endorsed Jorge Larrañaga for president. In the 2014 primaries, she endorsed Luis Lacalle Pou for president, having served as one of his alternates in the Senate. 

On April 16, 2018, she took office as President of the National Party, being the first woman to hold the position in the 182-year history of the party. She succeeded Luis Alberto Héber and stated "we must respect the times that each institution and each party have to make decisions of these characteristics." She remained in office until March 2020 because at that time she assumed the vice-presidency of the Republic.

Vice presidency (2020–present) 
In the 2019 presidential primaries, Luis Lacalle Pou won by 53% of the votes, and named Argimón as his vice presidential running mate for the October general election. 

Following the election of Lacalle Pou as President of Uruguay in the 2019 election, Argimón assumed office as vice president of the Uruguay on March 1, 2020. She is the Uruguay's first female vice president elected. On Saturday, November 30, in her first speech as vice president-elect, Argimón reaffirmed her commitment to the fight for gender equality. She was sworn in before the General Assembly on March 1, 2020.

Personal life
Argimón married Jorge Fernández Reyes on 14 December 2009. She has two children from previous marriages, María Belén and Juan Santiago.

References

External links
 

1961 births
Living people
Members of the Chamber of Representatives of Uruguay
National Party (Uruguay) politicians
Politicians from Montevideo
University of the Republic (Uruguay) alumni
Uruguayan notaries
Vice presidents of Uruguay
Uruguayan women's rights activists
Women vice presidents
21st-century Uruguayan women politicians
21st-century Uruguayan politicians